Ralph Robertson (31 August 1881 – 11 May 1917) was an Australian rules footballer who played with St Kilda in the Victorian Football League (VFL) and had a noted career in New South Wales.

Robertson was born in England and came to Melbourne when he was three years old. After playing initially for South Beach in the St Kilda League he debuted for the Saints' VFL side in 1899. He only experienced victory in one of his 14 senior games at St Kilda, which came in a one-point win against Melbourne in the opening round of the 1900 VFL season. Although primarily a rover, Robertson could also play as a centreman and up forward.

Due to his work, Robertson ended up in Sydney in 1901 and as there was no substantial Australian rules football competition he took up rugby union. In 1903 however, the NSW Australian Football Association began and Robertson was appointed vice captain of East Sydney for the inaugural season, where they won the premiership. He transferred to North Shore in 1909 and the following season played in another premiership team.

Amongst his 30 interstate matches for New South Wales, he captained the state at the 1908 Melbourne, 1911 Adelaide and 1914 Sydney carnivals. For his performances at the Sydney Carnival, Robertson was awarded a Referee Medal.

Robertson was killed in 1917 on active war service when the fighter plane he was piloting crashed into another over Egypt. In 2003 he was honoured as one of the inaugural members of the official Sydney AFL Hall of Fame.

See also
 List of Victorian Football League players who died in active service
 1908 Melbourne Carnival

References

External links

1881 births
1917 deaths
Australian rules footballers from Victoria (Australia)
St Kilda Football Club players
North Shore Australian Football Club players
East Sydney Australian Football Club players
VFL/AFL players born in England
Australian people of English descent
British military personnel killed in World War I
People from Aylestone
Sportspeople from Leicester